Ornithoptera aesacus, the Obi Island birdwing, is a rare species of birdwing butterfly, endemic to the Island of Obira (formerly Obi), Indonesia.

The specific epithet of Ornithoptera aesacus, is named after Æsacus, the eldest son of Priam.

History

The original description is: aesacus Ney, F. 1903 as Troides priamus Form aesacus. The full reference is Ney, F. 1903 Eine neue Troides-Form von Obi. Insekten-Börse 20 (5): 36., 1903.

The depository of the four syntypes collected by J. Waterstradt in May 1902 is unknown. They were once held by Hermann Rolle, whose collection, in part, was sold to Eugène Le Moult.

Description
Ornithoptera aesacus is a member of the Ornithoptera priamus species group. The two species are very similar but the male O. aesacus has a brilliant turquoise-blue sheen.

Taxonomy
The classification of Ornithoptera aesacus as a species does not have full consensus, and is sometimes regarded as a subspecies of Ornithoptera priamus by some, such as Parsons (1996).

Synonymy
O. obiana (Waterstradt in litt.) Rebel, 1906
O. obiensis Rippon, 1906
O. obiana (as O. arruana obiana) Rippon, 1906-1912

Distribution

The Obi Island birdwing is endemic to the Island of Obira in Indonesia. It inhabits tropical rainforest. Due to extensive logging on the Island the conservation of the species is a concern, and has been classified as 'Vulnerable' by the IUCN Twenty years ago it was the rarest birdwing species in the world. It remains threatened, but is commercially bred.

References

D'Abrera, B. (1975). Birdwing Butterflies of the World. Country Life Books, London.

Haugum, J. & Low, A.M. (1978-1985). A Monograph of the Birdwing Butterflies. 2 volumes. Scandinavian Press, Klampenborg; 663 pp.
Parsons, M.J. (1996). A phylogenetic reappraisal of the birdwing genus Ornithoptera (Lepidoptera: Papilionidae: Troidini) and a new theory of its evolution in relation to Gondwanan vicariance biogeography. Journal of Natural History 30(11):1707-1736.

External links

Globis.insects-online: Ornithoptera aesacus — from Zoologische Staatssammlung München.
Barcode of Life: Ornithoptera aesacus — from Consortium for the Barcode of Life.
Att.net.bret69: Images of Swallowtails 
Nagypal.net: Images
Worldwildlife.org: Southeastern Asia Ecoregion — "Islands of Halmahera, Moratai" 

aesacus
Butterflies of Indonesia
Endemic fauna of Indonesia
Fauna of the Maluku Islands
Vulnerable fauna of Oceania
Taxonomy articles created by Polbot
Butterflies described in 1903